The 1877 Totara by-election was a by-election held on 30 April 1877 in the  electorate on the West Coast of New Zealand during the 6th New Zealand Parliament.

The by-election was caused by the death of the incumbent MP George Henry Tribe on 19 March 1877.

The by-election was won by William Gisborne. The polling place at Saltwater Creek recorded only a single vote (for Gisborne). The partial result below has a majority of 57 for Gisborne, although a late return from Hunt's Beach at Jackson's Bay resulted in his majority being 83 or 84.

Results

References

Totara 1877
1877 elections in New Zealand
Politics of the West Coast, New Zealand
April 1877 events